Gagrellula is a genus of harvestmen in the family Sclerosomatidae from Asia.

Species
 Gagrellula aborana Roewer, 1954
 Gagrellula albatra Roewer, 1954
 Gagrellula albicoxa (Loman, 1892)
 Gagrellula albilineata Roewer, 1929
 Gagrellula albifrons Roewer, 1931
 Gagrellula albitarsis (Simon, 1899)
 Gagrellula andamana Roewer, 1929
 Gagrellula annulata Roewer, 1910
 Gagrellula atra (Loman, 1892)
 Gagrellula aurilimbata Roewer, 1923
 Gagrellula auropunctata Roewer, 1954
 Gagrellula bicolor Roewer, 1954
 Gagrellula bimaculata Roewer, 1911
 Gagrellula bipunctata Roewer, 1912
 Gagrellula brunnea Roewer, 1936
 Gagrellula chamberlini Roewer, 1954
 Gagrellula circulata Roewer, 1954
 Gagrellula conspersa Roewer, 1954
 Gagrellula convexa Roewer, 1954
 Gagrellula crux (With, 1903)
 Gagrellula cuncimaculata Roewer, 1954
 Gagrellula cuprilucens Roewer, 1954
 Gagrellula curvispina Roewer, 1912
 Gagrellula didyma Roewer, 1936
 Gagrellula fasciata Roewer, 1954
 Gagrellula frontalis Roewer, 1954
 Gagrellula ferruginea (Loman, 1902)
 Gagrellula fuscanalis Roewer, 1954
 Gagrellula geminata Roewer, 1954
 Gagrellula gertschi Roewer, 1954
 Gagrellula giltayi Roewer, 1954
 Gagrellula grandis Suzuki, 1955
 Gagrellula granulata S. Suzuki, 1986
 Gagrellula heinrichi Roewer, 1954
 Gagrellula indigena C.J.Goodnight & M.L.Goodnight, 1944
 Gagrellula johorea Roewer, 1954
 Gagrellula kubotai S. Suzuki, 1986
 Gagrellula laeviscutum Roewer, 1954
 Gagrellula leucanta Roewer, 1954
 Gagrellula lomanii (Thorell, 1894)
 Gagrellula luteipalpis Roewer, 1954
 Gagrellula luteomaculata Roewer, 1931
 Gagrellula melanotarsus Roewer, 1911
 Gagrellula metallica Roewer, 1929
 Gagrellula montana Sato & Suzuki, 1938
 Gagrellula niasensis (Thorell, 1891)
 Gagrellula niveata Roewer, 1954
 Gagrellula opposita Roewer, 1954
 Gagrellula orissa Roewer, 1954
 Gagrellula palawana Roewer, 1954
 Gagrellula palnica Roewer, 1929
 Gagrellula parra Roewer, 1929
 Gagrellula pulverulenta Roewer, 1913
 Gagrellula riridula Roewer, 1929
 Gagrellula rufifrons Roewer, 1954
 Gagrellula rufoscutum Roewer, 1912
 Gagrellula saddlana Roewer, 1929
 Gagrellula scabra Roewer, 1910
 Gagrellula schenkeli Roewer, 1954
 Gagrellula siberutiana Roewer, 1929
 Gagrellula simaluris Roewer, 1923
 Gagrellula simla Roewer, 1954
 Gagrellula simplex Roewer, 1954
 Gagrellula trichopalpis Roewer, 1954
 Gagrellula unicolor Roewer, 1910
 Gagrellula virescens Roewer, 1910
 Gagrellula vittata Roewer, 1912

References

Harvestmen
Harvestman genera